The Puketāpapa Local Board is one of the 21 local boards of the Auckland Council, and is one of the two boards overseen by the council's Albert-Eden-Puketāpapa ward councilors.

The Puketāpapa board, named after the Māori name for Mount Roskill, covers the suburbs of Hillsborough, Lynfield, Mount Roskill, Three Kings, Waikowhai, and Wesley.

The board is governed by six board members elected at-large. The first board members were elected by the nationwide local elections, which were held on Saturday 9 October 2010.

The Puketāpapa board collaborated closely with Beca on the Hinaki Eel Trap Bridge.

Demographics

Puketāpapa Local Board Area had a population of 57,555 at the 2018 New Zealand census, an increase of 4,617 people (8.7%) since the 2013 census, and an increase of 6,753 people (13.3%) since the 2006 census. There were 17,328 households, comprising 28,677 males and 28,878 females, giving a sex ratio of 0.99 males per female. The median age was 33.8 years (compared with 37.4 years nationally), with 10,098 people (17.5%) aged under 15 years, 15,078 (26.2%) aged 15 to 29, 25,365 (44.1%) aged 30 to 64, and 7,014 (12.2%) aged 65 or older.

Ethnicities were 33.6% European/Pākehā, 6.0% Māori, 15.2% Pacific peoples, 49.1% Asian, and 4.6% other ethnicities. People may identify with more than one ethnicity.

The percentage of people born overseas was 52.7, compared with 27.1% nationally.

Although some people chose not to answer the census's question about religious affiliation, 32.1% had no religion, 36.6% were Christian, 0.3% had Māori religious beliefs, 14.0% were Hindu, 7.4% were Muslim, 2.4% were Buddhist and 2.5% had other religions.

Of those at least 15 years old, 16,167 (34.1%) people had a bachelor's or higher degree, and 5,763 (12.1%) people had no formal qualifications. The median income was $30,100, compared with $31,800 nationally. 7,668 people (16.2%) earned over $70,000 compared to 17.2% nationally. The employment status of those at least 15 was that 23,505 (49.5%) people were employed full-time, 6,654 (14.0%) were part-time, and 1,908 (4.0%) were unemployed.

2022–2025 term
The board members, elected at the 2022 local body elections, in election order:
Ella Kumar, C&R – Communities and Residents, (6682 votes)
Roseanne Hay, C&R – Communities and Residents, (6670 votes)
Fiona Lai, C&R – Communities and Residents, (6236 votes)
Jon Turner, Roskill Community Voice, (5421 votes)
Bobby Shen, Roskill Community Voice, (5317 votes)
Mark Pervan, C&R – Communities and Residents, (4882 votes)

2019–2022 term
The board members, elected at the 2019 local body elections, in election order:
Ella Kumar, C&R – Communities and Residents, (6528 votes)
Julie Fairey, Roskill Community Voice, (6390 votes)
Jon Turner, Roskill Community Voice, (6157 votes)
Fiona Lai, C&R – Communities and Residents, (5956 votes)
Bobby Shen, Roskill Community Voice, (5693 votes)
Harry Doig, Roskill Community Voice, (5545 votes)

References

Local boards of the Auckland Region